Florida's 1st Senate District is a legislative district which elects members to the Florida Senate. It encompasses all of Escambia County, Santa Rosa County, and part of Okaloosa County. The district is currently represented by Doug Broxson, a Republican, who was first elected in 2016.

List of Senators 
NOTE: The following Information was gathered from the Florida Senate website. Only records of senators from 1998-present are kept.

Elections 
NOTE: The following results were gathered from the Florida Department of State. Uncontested election results are not provided.

1988

1992

2002

2008

2016

2022

References

Florida Senate districts